Heber Percy Slatter (1887 – 7 May 1918) was an English amateur footballer who played in the Southern League for Reading as a left half. He also played in the Isthmian League for Oxford City.

Personal life
Slatter was born in Earley and grew up in Reading. He attended Christ's Hospital, and later worked as a tax collector for Reading Council. He was married with two children. In November 1915, during the second year of the First World War, Slatter enlisted as a gunner in the Royal Garrison Artillery. After being posted to the Western Front in 1916, he was promoted to corporal. He was wounded by shellfire at Foncquevillers on 3 May 1918 and died of wounds four days later. Slatter was buried in Couin New British Cemetery.

Honours 
Reading

 Southern League Second Division: 1910–11

References

1887 births
1918 deaths
People from Earley
Footballers from Berkshire
English footballers
Reading F.C. players
British Army personnel of World War I
Royal Garrison Artillery soldiers
British military personnel killed in World War I

Association football wing halves
Oxford City F.C. players
Isthmian League players
People educated at Christ's Hospital
Tax collectors
Burials at Couin New British Cemetery
Military personnel from Berkshire